Robert Franklin Hoxie (April 29, 1868 – June 22, 1916) was an American economist, known for his work on labor history.

Born in Edmeston, New York to Solomon and Lucy Hoxie, Hoxie obtained his PhD in economics at the University of Chicago. After graduation, he lectured at the University of Chicago until his early death in 1916. In the year 1914–1915 he served as special investigator in the U.S. Commission on Industrial Relations.

Selected publications 
 Hoxie, Robert Franklin. The demand and supply concepts. The University of Chicago press, 1906.
 Hoxie, Robert Franklin. Scientific management and labor. D. Appleton and Company, 1915; 1921.
 Hoxie, Robert Franklin and Nathan Fine. Trade unionism in the United States. D. Appleton and Company, 1919; 1921.

References 

1868 births
1926 deaths
American business theorists
Economists from New York (state)
People from Edmeston, New York
University of Chicago alumni
University of Chicago faculty
Journal of Political Economy editors